

The Special Event Service Line was a light rail line operated by the San Diego Trolley, an operating division of the San Diego Metropolitan Transit System. These trains operated between Qualcomm Stadium and downtown San Diego's Gaslamp Quarter during sporting events at Petco Park and Qualcomm Stadium, as well as selected conventions and other major city events. These trains ran anywhere from every  to 15 minutes apart in addition to normally scheduled trains based on the time, size and location of the event.

The Special Event Line was used between 2005 through 2012, after which it was shut down as part of a system redesign. The entire route the Special Event line ran is now served by the Green Line, and MTS now opts to add cars and increase service on that route when needed.

The last Special Event Trolley departed at 6:54 pm on August 29, 2012.

Stops along the Special Event Line

Railway lines opened in 2005
Railway lines closed in 2012
San Diego Trolley lines